Blake Bartlett (born 2 March 1993) is a Bahamian sprinter.

Bartlett won a bronze medal in the 100 and 200 metres at the 2012 Central American and Caribbean Junior Championships in Athletics in San Salvador. He is From Freeport, Bahamas

References

External links

1993 births
Living people
Bahamian male sprinters
People from Freeport, Bahamas